Kapiolani Medical Center for Women and Children is part of Hawaii Pacific Health's network of hospitals. It is located in Honolulu, Hawaii, within the residential inner-city district of Makiki. Kapiolani Medical Center is Hawaii's only children's hospital with a  team of physicians and nurses and specialized technology trained specifically to care for children, from infants to young adults. It is the state's only 24-hour pediatric emergency department, pediatric intensive care unit and adolescent unit. The hospital provides comprehensive pediatric specialties and subspecialties to infants, children, teens, and young adults aged 0–21 throughout Hawaii.

The facility was founded by Queen Kapiolani as the Kapiolani Maternity Home in 1890 for which she held bazaars and luaus to raise $8,000 needed to start the Home. It has since changed its name several times. Kauikeolani Children's Hospital opened in 1909 named for Emma Kauikeōlani Napoleon Mahelona (1862–1931), the wife of Albert Spencer Wilcox (1844–1919).  In 1978, it merged with Kapiolani Hospital to become Kapiolani Medical Center for Women and Children.

Historical timeline

Kapiolani Hospital
 In 1884, Princess Victoria Kekaulike died and willed her home, Ululani, as the site of a proposed maternity home to help Hawaiian mothers.
 In 1890, after the princess's sister, Queen Kapiolani, raised $8,000 through bazaars and luaus, she founded the Kapiolani Home of the Hooulu and Hoola Lahui Society (society to propagate and perpetuate the race), located at Beretania and Makiki streets, to provide a maternity home for Hawaiian women. The five-bedroom home was opened on June 14, 1890, by King Kalākaua and Queen Kapiolani. Only six babies were born at the home the first year since Native Hawaiian women remained suspicious of doctors and institutions.
 In 1917, the society purchased the adjacent August Dreier property southeast of Ululani on Beretania Street.
 In 1918, the home moved to a two-story house with 25 beds at 1538 S. Beretania Street, changed its name to the Kapiolani Maternity Home, and opened its doors to women of other than Hawaiian descent.
 In 1927, the trustees purchased the property of Dr. John Whitney on the southeast corner of Punahou and Bingham streets to build a new maternity home.
 In 1928, groundbreaking ceremonies for the new maternity home were held on June 28.
 In 1929, the home moved on March 26 to a new larger building with 50 beds (in twenty-two private rooms, four 2-bedrooms, and two wards) located on the southeast corner of Punahou and Bingham streets and expanded its functions to include non-infectious gynecological problems. The original Whitney home was converted to a nurses' home.
 In 1931, its name was changed to the Kapiolani Maternity and Gynecological Hospital.
 In 1939, after purchasing the adjacent Spalding property south of the hospital on Punahou Street, the Spalding home was converted into a nurses' home named the Kekaulike Nurses' Home.
 In 1945, the hospital, at 1611 Bingham Street, finished construction of the two-story Ewa wing that doubled its capacity to 110 beds.
 In 1957, the hospital completed a new and enlarged nursery.
 In 1961, former president Barack Obama was born in the hospital on August 4.
 In 1966, the hospital completed a new four-story Lani Ward Booth wing on Punahou Street, with the top two floors left as shells, capacity remained at 110 beds.
 In 1970, the hospital finished the fourth floor of the Lani Booth wing on Punahou Street, capacity increased to 138 beds.
 In 1971, its name was changed to Kapiolani Hospital.
 In 1974, the hospital began a major rebuilding project, adding an eleven-story hospital and medical office tower on the southeast corner of Punahou and Bingham Streets, a three-story building, and a parking structure for a combined Kapiolani/Children's Medical Center.
 In 1976, the new tower was dedicated and Kapiolani patients were moved to its second and fourth floors.
 In 1977, a section of the original 1929 building was torn down and tiles from its roof were sold to commemorate the 145,000 babies born under it from 1929 to 1977.

Kauikeolani Children's Hospital
 In 1908, Albert Spencer Wilcox (1844–1919) gave $55,000 and other private subscribers gave an additional $50,000 to buy several acres of land and erect a two-story comparatively small, homelike children's hospital (with preference given to Hawaiian children) at 226 N. Kuakini Street, named after Wilcox's wife, Emma Kauikeolani Napoliean Mahelona (1862–1931). A maternity service was soon after added to the hospital.
 In 1929, the maternity service at the hospital was discontinued.
 In 1950, a new, modern two-story hospital building with a capacity of 100 beds replaced the original building.
 In 1953, the Rehabilitation Center of Hawaii was established by the Kauikeolani Children's Hospital Foundation.
 In 1969, the rehabilitation center was renamed the Pacific Institute of Rehabilitation Medicine.
 In 1975, the rehabilitation center separated from Kauikeolani Children's Hospital to become the independent Rehabilitation Hospital of the Pacific, which expanded into the 1950 Kauikeolani Children's Hospital building after the latter relocated to Kapiolani/Children's Medical Center on September 15, 1978.

Kapiolani Medical Center for Women and Children
 In 1976, Kapiolani Hospital and Kauikeolani Children's Hospital began a protracted, decade-long merger.
 In 1978, Kauikeolani Children's Hospital moved into the new eleven-story (226-bed, 108-bassinet) Kapiolani/Children's Medical Center tower located at 1319 Punahou Street on the southeast corner of Punahou and Bingham streets—initially with separate entrances for the pediatricians on Bingham Street and the obstetricians on Punahou Street.
 In 1984, the medical staff and board of directors of the two former hospitals were merged.
 In 1986, the two former hospitals formally completed their merger.
 In 1989, Kapiolani purchased for $76 million the new 116-bed Pali Momi Medical Center in Aiea, built by Health Care International, six months after it opened.
 In 2001, Kapiolani Medical Center for Women and Children and Kapiolani Medical Center at Pali Momi in Aiea merged with Wilcox Memorial Hospital in Lihue on the Hawaiian island of Kauai (founded in 1938) and the Straub Clinic & Hospital (founded in 1921) on King Street, under a new parent company, Hawaii Pacific Health.

References

Sources

Footnotes

External links 

 

Hospitals in Hawaii
Children's hospitals in the United States
Buildings and structures in Honolulu
1890 establishments in Hawaii
Women's hospitals
Barack Obama
Women in Hawaii